Tarrantia is a form genus of small fossil plants of Early Devonian age. The diagnostic characters are naked parallel-sided axes branching isotomously, terminating in solitary elliptical to ovate sporangia with height greater than width. The relationships of the genus are not clear because many anatomical details remain unknown. It has been treated as a possible rhyniophyte.

The only known species is from Wales.

References

Early Devonian plants
Prehistoric plant genera
Early Devonian first appearances
Early Devonian genus extinctions